Miralda is a genus of sea snails, marine gastropod mollusks in the family Pyramidellidae, the pyrams, and their allies.

Species
Species within the genus Miralda include:

 Miralda agana Bartsch, 1915
 Miralda attentissima (Nomura, 1936)
 Miralda austropacifica Oliver, W.R.B., 1915 
 Miralda brevicula (Melvill & Standen, 1903)
 Miralda conica Laseron, 1959
 Miralda corona Saurin, 1959
 Miralda diadema (A. Adams, 1860)
 Miralda diademaeformis (Nomura, 1938)
 Miralda eximia (Dautzenberg & Fischer, 1907)
 Miralda fastigata Peñas & Rolán, 2017
 Miralda franciscae Saurin, 1958
 Miralda galloisi Saurin, 1959
 Miralda gemma (A. Adams, 1861)
 Miralda idalima Melvill, 1896
 Miralda ima (Melvill, 1906)
 Miralda laetitia (Melvill & Standen, 1903)
 † Miralda mellianensis Lozouet, 1998 
 Miralda minusnodosa Peñas & Rolán, 2017
 Miralda montuosa Laseron, 1951 
 Miralda nodulosa (Hornung & Mermod, 1924) 
 Miralda opephora Melvill, J.C., 1898 
 Miralda oscillaeformis Saurin, 1962
 Miralda parcecoronata Peñas & Rolán, 2017
 Miralda paucisculpta Peñas & Rolán, 2017
 Miralda paulbartschi (Pilsbry, 1918)
 Miralda philippinensis Peñas & Rolán, 2017
 Miralda pretiosa (Dautzenberg & Fischer, 1907)
 Miralda pretiosior Saurin, 1962
 Miralda primaliciae Saurin, 1962
 Miralda protogalea Peñas & Rolán, 2017
 Miralda pseudogemma Peñas & Rolán, 2017
 Miralda revincta (Hedley, 1912)
 Miralda robusta Peñas & Rolán, 2017
 Miralda scopulorum (Watson, 1886)
 Miralda senex (Hedley, 1902)
 Miralda sitizoi (Nomura, 1937)
 Miralda soteloi Rolan, 1994 
 Miralda subnodosa Peñas & Rolán, 2017
 Miralda subtilstriae Peñas & Rolán, 2017
 Miralda superba Rolán & Fernandes, 1993
 Miralda suzettae Saurin, 1959
 Miralda temperata Rolán & Fernandes, 1993
 Miralda trinodosa Peñas & Rolán, 2017
 Miralda ultranodosa Peñas & Rolán, 2017
 Miralda umeralis (Hedley, 1902)

The following species were brought into synonymy
 Miralda abbotti: synonym of Ividella abbotti (Olsson & McGinty, 1958)
 Miralda aepynota: synonym of Ividia aepynota (Dall & Bartsch, 1909)
 Miralda annulata A. Adams, 1855: synonym of Oscilla annulata (A. Adams, 1854)
 Miralda azteca (Strong, A.M. & L.G. Hertlein, 1939): synonym of Odostomia azteca Strong, A.M. & L.G. Hertlein, 1939
 Miralda crispa G. B. Sowerby III, 1892 : synonym of Odostomia crispa (G. B. Sowerby III, 1892)
 Miralda elegans (de Folin, 1870): synonym of Liamorpha elegans (de Folin, 1870)
 Miralda gemmifera (Dautzenberg & Fischer, 1907): synonym of Liamorpha gemmifera (Dautzenberg & H. Fischer, 1907)
 Miralda havanensis: synonym of Ividia havanensis (Pilsbry & Aguayo, 1933)
 Miralda ligata (Angas, 1877): synonym of Oscilla ligata Angas, 1877
 Miralda mariella: synonym of Egilina mariella (A. Adams, 1860)
 Miralda neofelixoides (Nomura, 1936): synonym of Iolaea neofelixoides (Nomura, 1936)
 Miralda pupu Pilsbry, 1918: synonym of  Hinemoa indica (Melvill, 1896) 
 Miralda robertsoni Altena, 1975: synonym of Iolaea robertsoni (van Regteren Altena, 1975)
 Miralda scitula (A. Adams, 1860): synonym of Iolaea scitula (A. Adams, 1860)
 Miralda suprasculpta: synonym of Hinemoa suprasculpta (Tenison Woods, 1878)
 Miralda syrtites Pilsbry, 1917: synonym of Miralda scopulorum (R. B. Watson, 1886)
 Miralda terryi (Olsson & McGinty, 1958): synonym of  Ivara terryi (Olsson & McGinty, 1958)

References

 Peñas A. & Rolán E. (2017). Deep water Pyramidelloidea from the central and South Pacific. The tribe Chrysallidini. ECIMAT (Estación de Ciencias Mariñas de Toralla), Universidade de Vigo. 412 pp.

External links
 Adams A. (1863). On the species of Pyramidellinae found in Japan. Journal of the Proceedings of the Linnean Society of London, 7: 1-6
 To ITIS
 To World Register of Marine Species

Pyramidellidae
Gastropod genera